Rinorea brachythrix is a species of plant in the Violaceae family and is endemic to Panama.

References

Endemic flora of Panama
brachythrix
Vulnerable plants
Taxonomy articles created by Polbot